The 1927 KBUs Pokalturnering (Unofficial English translation: 1927 KBU Cup, 1927 Copenhagen Cup) was the 18th edition of the regional tournament, KBUs Pokalturnering, the highest senior cup competition organised by the Copenhagen FA (KBU). The tournament was held in the fall of 1927 with B.93 as the defending cup champions. The season was launched on 28 August 1927 with the two matches featuring three of the lowest placed league teams from the previous season. BK Frem won the 1927 edition by defeating the previous season's cup champions, Østerbro-based B.93, 3–2 in the final after 3–0 lead halfway through the second half and an overall even match, played at Københavns Idrætspark on 6 November 1927, which was the BK Frem's second cup title in the tournament after seven appearances in the finals. The 8 participants in the tournament included the six members of the 1926–27 KBUs Mesterskabsrække and the two highest placed teams from the 1926–27 KBUs A-række.

The team line-up of Kjøbenhavns BK in the cup match against Akademisk BK consisted mostly of young and newly promoted senior players. The winners, Handelsstandens BK, of the 1926–27 KBUs A-række, the second-tier league under the Kjøbenhavns Boldspil-Union, managed to get past the first round by defeating the runners-up of the Copenhagen second highest league, Østerbros BK, before eventually being eliminated by B.93 in the second round.

The first round match between Østerbros BK and Handelsstandens BK at Københavns Idrætspark (Idrætsparkens Fodboldbane), for the first time in Danish football, featured the squad numbers 1–22 on white squares, which were placed high on the back of all the outfield players and on the chest of the goalkeepers — numbers 1–11 were carried by the players of Handelsstandens BK, while numbers 12–22 were carried by the Østerbros BK players. The reform experiment, receiving mixed reviews by the local newspapers, was meant as a service for the spectators nothing familiar with individual players, who were listed next to their numbers in the matchday programme. The Nationaltidende's journalist argued that the numbers were too hard to spot on the players located farthest away and wearing long-striped jerseys using multiple colours. The many double-digit numbers only made it harder to see, and 2 times 1–11 would suffice. The writer for Berlingske Tidende deemed the experiment a success, finding that the numbers were large and clear and easy to read, requesting that the idea be tried again in front of a larger audience. The usage of numbered player jerseys at an official Danish game took place shortly after the first attempt had been made at an unofficial preparation match in English football featured Chelsea F.C. players.

Participants

Matches

Bracket

Quarter-finals

Semi-finals

Cup Final

Match summary

The match was refereed by Lauritz Andersen (previously affiliated with BK Velo), who had previously refereed two quarterfinal matches in this season's cup tournament and previous season's cup final. The final match was played at Københavns Idrætspark for the fifteenth time in the tournament's history, on 6 November 1927. The draw concerning the right to choose the starting half on the football field was won by BK Frem's captain Pauli Jørgensen, over the opposing team captain Fritz Tarp (B.93), selecting the goal facing the west side, towards Øster Allé — the choice did not play any significant role during the match as there were no considerable sunlight or wind. The field was reportedly very soft and during the first half, a short-lived breeze fell.

The match, which was delayed 5 minutes, started at a high pace. The first goal was conceived after only 5 minutes by BK Frem's Svend Hansen, when his shot from the right side of the field hit the right goal post projecting inside the net just next to the left goalpost, outside the reach of the 93's goalkeeper, Svend Jensen. The 1–0 lead energizes the BK Frem players, but several attempts do not materialise into an additional goal. After getting an accident with his knee in the 11th minute, BK Frem's Knud Christophersen have to temporarily leave the football field for three minutes to recover. B.93 gets the upper hand with many and the most dangerous attacks with goals prevented safely by the BK Frem goalkeeper, Niels Hansen, while BK Frem are sentenced to several fouls committed in this period. Unexpected, forward Carl Stoltz increase BK Frem's lead to 2–0 upon a powerful kick with him left foot towards the right goal post, placing a renewed pressure on the B.93 players.

The second half took place mostly on the BK Frem's half of the field, where the B.93 players struggled to void the lead made by BK Frem. After several B.93 attempts at the beginning of the second half, BK Frem gets an opportunity in the 63rd minute. BK Frem's forward Robert Jensen shots the ball over Svend Jensen's head, hitting the right goal post farthest away, and bouncing into the goal net near the left goal post, increasing the lead to 3–0 – almost identical to the first BK Frem goal made in the first half. B.93 decided to regroup, placing three of their players, Fritz Tarp as left innerwing, Børge Mørch as left half and Helge Scharff as right back, in positions, that they are not used to playing. B.93 is awarded a corner on the left side after an error committed by BK Frem's defender, Eiler Holm. The following corner kick ends up at Kaj Plaugmann, who makes one single move, and then shots the ball into the roof of the goal with his left foot, finally giving B.93 a goal in the match 4 minutes after BK Frem's last goal, reducing the overall score to 3–1. For the remaining part of the second half, there are almost continuous attacks by the B.93's players. With two minutes remaining of the match, B.93 gets their second and the last goal of an overall even match, once again made by Kaj Plaugmann.

BK Frem hence won the 1927 edition of the KBUs Pokalturnering, and were crowned Copenhagen Cup Champions (Danish: KBU pokalmestre), by defeating the previous season's cup champions, B.93, 3–2 in the final after 3–0 lead almost two-thirds into the match, which was the BK Frem's second championship in the tournament after seven appearances in the final. B.93's forward Børge Mørch and BK Frem's Pauli Jørgensen were highlighted as the best players on the field — though they did not score, they created the opportunities for their colleagues. The Valby-team players celebrated the win in the evening at the Centralbanehotellet situated on Halmtorvet.

Match details

Statistics

Scoring

Top scorers

Hat-tricks

 5 Player scored 5 goals

Clean sheets

References

KBUs Pokalturnering
KBUs Pokalturnering
Denmark